Sir Alfred George Fletcher Hall-Davis (21 June 1924 – 20 November 1979) was a British Conservative Party politician.

Hall-Davis was educated at Terra Nova School, Birkdale and Clifton College, Bristol. He was a director of a brewery, hotel and other companies and served on the Conservative Party executive.

Hall-Davis contested St Helens in 1950 and Chorley in 1951 and 1955.
He was Member of Parliament for Morecambe and Lonsdale from 1964 until 1979, preceding Mark Lennox-Boyd. From 1973 to 1974, he was an assistant government whip. He was knighted in the 1979 Birthday Honours.

Hall-Davis died at the age of 55, six months after leaving the House of Commons.

References

Times Guide to the House of Commons, October 1974

People educated at Clifton College
1924 births
1979 deaths
Conservative Party (UK) MPs for English constituencies
Knights Bachelor
Politicians awarded knighthoods
UK MPs 1964–1966
UK MPs 1966–1970
UK MPs 1970–1974
UK MPs 1974
UK MPs 1974–1979